Panicudine (6-hydroxy-11-deoxy-13-dehydrohetisane) is a C20-diterpene alkaloid of the hetisine type, first isolated from Aconitum paniculatum.  It has empirical formula C20H25NO3 and a melting point of 249–250 °C.  The structure was determined to be a hetisine type diterpene by noting infrared spectrum absorption bands of 3405 cm−1 (OH), 1718 (C=O), and 1650 (C=C), a proton magnetic resonance spectrum with "secondary hydroxy (4.02 ppm, m, 1H, W1/2 = 10 Hz), exomethylene (4.87 and 4.76 ppm, br.s, 1H each), and tertiary methyl (1.29 ppm, s, 3H) groups and the absence of N-methyl, N-ethyl, and methoxy groups."  Additional ultraviolet spectrum and carbon-13 NMR data, confirmed by high resolution mass spectrometry, completed the determination of the structure.

Panicudine was identified as an active antimicrobial substance in the chloroform extract of Polygonum aviculare, a traditional herbal medicine of the Mediterranean coastal region.  It has also been isolated from epigeal parts of Rumex pictus.

Related compounds
Panicutine is the acetate ester of panicudine.

A variety of related alkaloids have been isolated from other natural sources.

References 

Diterpene alkaloids
Amines
Ketones
Heterocyclic compounds with 6 rings
Vinylidene compounds